Sir Ernest Handforth Goodman Roberts (20 April 1890 – 14 February 1969) was a Welsh barrister and Conservative Party politician who served as Member of Parliament (MP) for Flintshire from 1924 to 1929, before becoming the Chief Justice of the Rangoon High Court.

Biography 
Roberts was educated at Malvern College and Trinity College, Oxford, where he was President of the Oxford Union. During the First World War, he was a captain in the Royal Welch Fusiliers and a court-martial officer in Palestine, for which he was mentioned in despatches. 

Roberts was called to the Bar at the Inner Temple in 1916. He first stood for election to the House of Commons at the 1923 general election, when he failed to unseat the sitting Liberal MP Thomas Henry Parry. At the 1924 general election, when the reappearance of a Labour Party candidate split created a 3-way contest, he won the seat by a comfortable majority of 12% of the votes. He was defeated at the 1929 general election, and did not stand for Parliament again.

From 1936, when he was knighted, to 1948 he was the Chief Justice of the High Court of Judicature at Rangoon. He was made a Queen's Counsel in 1949 and frequently served as Commissioner of Assize.

References

External links 

1890 births
1969 deaths
Conservative Party (UK) MPs for Welsh constituencies
UK MPs 1924–1929
Presidents of the Oxford Union
British Burma judges
Knights Bachelor
English King's Counsel
20th-century King's Counsel
Members of the Inner Temple
Royal Welch Fusiliers officers
British Army personnel of World War I
Alumni of Trinity College, Oxford
People educated at Malvern College